The Hwajeong Museum is a museum in Pyeongchang-dong, Jongno District, Seoul, South Korea.

See also
List of museums in South Korea

External links

Art museums and galleries in Seoul
Buildings and structures in Jongno District